are the standards used for industrial activities in Japan, coordinated by the Japanese Industrial Standards Committee (JISC) and published by the Japanese Standards Association (JSA). The JISC is composed of many nationwide committees and plays a vital role in standardizing activities across Japan.

History
In the Meiji era, private enterprises were responsible for making standards, although the Japanese government too had standards and specification documents for procurement purposes for certain articles, such as munitions.

These were summarized to form an official standard, the Japanese Engineering Standard, in 1921. During World War II, simplified standards were established to increase matériel output.

The present Japanese Standards Association was established in 1946, a year after Japan's defeat in World War II. The Japanese Industrial Standards Committee regulations were promulgated in 1946, and new standards were formed.

The Industrial Standardization Law was enacted in 1949, which forms the legal foundation for the present Japanese Industrial Standards.

New JIS mark
The Industrial Standardization Law was revised in 2004 and the JIS product certification mark was changed; since October 1, 2005, the new JIS mark has been used upon re-certification. Use of the old mark was allowed during a three-year transition period ending on September 30, 2008, and every manufacturer was able to use the new JIS mark. Therefore all JIS-certified Japanese products manufactured since October 1, 2008, have had the new JIS mark.

Standards classification and numbering
Standards are named in the format "JIS X 0208:1997", where X denotes area division, followed by four digits designating the area (five digits for ISO-corresponding standards), and four final digits designating the revision year.

Divisions of JIS and significant standards are:
  – Civil engineering and architecture
  – Mechanical engineering
 JIS B 1012 - JIS screw drive, which is not the same as Phillips
 JIS B 7021:2013 – Water resistant watches for general use—Classification and water resistance 
 JIS B 7512:2016 – Steel tape measures
 JIS B 7516:2005 – Metal rules
  – Electronics and electrical engineering
 JIS C 0920:2003 – Degrees of protection provided by enclosures (IP Code)
 JIS C 5062:2008 – Marking codes for resistors and capacitors
 JIS C 5063:1997 – Preferred number series for resistors and capacitors
 JIS C 7001 – Type designation system for electronic tubes
 JIS C 7012 – Type designation system for discrete semiconductor devices
 JIS C 8800:2008 – Glossary of terms for fuel cell power systems
  – Automotive engineering
  – Railway engineering
  – Ship building
  – Ferrous materials and metallurgy
 JIS G 3101 – Rolled steels for general structure
 JIS G 3103 – Carbon steel and molybdenum alloy steel plates for boilers and pressure vessels
 JIS G 3106 – Rolled steels for welded structure
 JIS G 3108 – Rolled carbon steel for cold-finished steel bars
 JIS G 3114 - Hot-rolled atmospheric corrosion resisting steels for welded structure
 JIS G 3115 – Steel plates for pressure vessels for intermediate temperature service
 JIS G 3118 – Carbon steel plates for pressure vessels for intermediate and moderate temperature services
 JIS G 3126 – Carbon steel plates for pressure vessels for low temperature service
 JIS G 3141 – Commercial Cold Rolled SPCC Steels
 JIS G 4304 – Hot-rolled stainless steel plate, sheet and strip
 JIS G 4305 – Cold-rolled stainless steel plate, sheet and strip
  – Nonferrous materials and metallurgy
 JIS H 2105 – Pig lead
 JIS H 2107 – Zinc ingots
 JIS H 2113 – Cadmium metal
 JIS H 2116 – Tungsten powder and tungsten carbide powder
 JIS H 2118 – Aluminum alloy ingots for die castings
 JIS H 2121 – Electrolytic cathode copper
 JIS H 2141 – Silver bullion
 JIS H 2201 – Zinc alloy ingots for die casting
 JIS H 2202 – Copper alloy ingots for castings
 JIS H 2211 – Aluminium alloy ingots for castings
 JIS H 2501 – Phosphor copper metal
 JIS H 3100 – Copper and copper alloy sheets, plates and strips
 JIS H 3110 – Phosphor bronze and nickel silver sheets, plates and strips
 JIS H 3130 – Copper beryllium alloy, copper titanium alloy, phosphor bronze, copper-nickel-tin alloy and nickel silver sheets, plates and strips for springs
 JIS H 3140 – Copper bus bars
 JIS H 3250 – Copper and copper alloy rods and bars
 JIS H 3260 – Copper and copper alloy wires
 JIS H 3270 – Copper beryllium alloy, phosphor bronze and nickel silver rods, bars and wires
 JIS H 3300 – Copper and copper alloy seamless pipes and tubes
 JIS H 3320 – Copper and copper alloy welded pipes and tubes
 JIS H 3330 – Plastic covered copper tubes
 JIS H 3401 – Pipe fittings of copper and copper alloys
 JIS H 4000 – Aluminium and aluminium alloy sheets and plates, strips and coiled sheets
 JIS H 4001 – Painted aluminium and aluminium alloy sheets and strips
 JIS H 4040 – Aluminium and aluminium alloy rods, bars and wires
 JIS H 4080 – Aluminium and aluminium alloys extruded tubes and cold-drawn tubes
 JIS H 4090 – Aluminium and aluminium alloy welded pipes and tubes
 JIS H 4100 – Aluminium and aluminium alloy extruded shape
 JIS H 4160 – Aluminium and aluminium alloy foils
 JIS H 4170 – High purity aluminium foils
 JIS H 4301 – Lead and lead alloy sheets and plates
 JIS H 4303 – DM lead sheets and plates
 JIS H 4311 – Lead and lead alloy tubes for common industries
 JIS H 4461 – Tungsten wires for lighting and electronic equipments
 JIS H 4463 – Thoriated tungsten wires and rods for lighting and electronic equipment
 JIS H 4631 – Titanium and titanium alloy tubes for heat exchangers
 JIS H 4635 – Titanium and titanium alloy welded pipes
 JIS H 5401 – White metal
 JIS H 8300 – Thermal spraying―zinc, aluminium and their alloys
 JIS H 8601 – Anodic oxide coatings on aluminium and aluminium alloys
 JIS H 8602 – Combined coatings of anodic oxide and organic coatings on aluminium and aluminium alloys
 JIS H 8615 – Electroplated coatings of chromium for engineering purposes
 JIS H 8641 – Zinc hot dip galvanizings
 JIS H 8642 – Hot dip aluminized coatings on ferrous products
  –  Chemical engineering
  – Textile engineering
  – Mining
  – Pulp and paper
 JIS P 0138-61 (JIS P 0138:1998): process finished paper size (ISO 216 with a slightly larger B series)
  – Management systems
 JIS Q 9001 - Quality management systems - requirements
 JIS Q 9002 - Quality management systems - Guidelines for the application of JIS Q 9001
 JIS Q 9004 - Quality management - Quality of an organization - Guidance to achieve sustained success
 JIS Q 9005 - Quality management systems - Guidelines for sustained success
 JIS Q 14001 - Environment management systems - requirements with guidance for use
 JIS Q 15001 - Personal information protection management systems - requirements
 JIS Q 20000-1 - IT service management - specification
 JIS Q 21500 - Guidance on project management
 JIS Q 27001 - Information security management systems - requirements
  – Ceramics
  – Domestic wares
  – Medical equipment and safety appliances
  – Aircraft and aviation
  – Information processing
 JIS X 0201:1997 – Japanese national variant of the ISO 646 7-bit character set
 JIS X 0202:1998 – Japanese national standard which corresponds to the ISO 2022 character encoding
 JIS X 0208:1997 – 7-bit and 8-bit double byte coded kanji sets for information interchange
 JIS X 0212:1990 – Supplementary Japanese graphic character set for information interchange
 JIS X 0213:2004 – 7-bit and 8-bit double byte coded extended Kanji sets for information interchange
 JIS X 0221-1:2001 – Japanese national standard which corresponds to ISO 10646
 JIS X 0401:1973 – Todofuken (prefecture) identification code
 JIS X 0402:2003 – Identification code for cities, towns and villages
 JIS X 0405:1994 – Commodity classification code
 JIS X 0408:2004 – Identification code for universities and colleges
 JIS X 0501:1985 – Bar code symbol for uniform commodity code
 JIS X 0510:2004 – QR code
 JIS X 3001-1:2009, JIS X 3001-2:2002, JIS X 3001-3:2000 – Fortran programming language
 JIS X 3002:2001 – COBOL
 JIS X 3005-1:2010 – SQL
 JIS X 3010:2003 – C programming language
 JIS X 3014:2003 – C++
 JIS X 3017:2011, JIS X 3017:2013 – Programming languages – Ruby
 JIS X 3030:1994 – POSIX - repealed in 2010
 JIS X 4061:1996 – Collation of Japanese character string
 JIS X 6002:1980 – Keyboard layout for information processing using the JIS 7 bit coded character set
 JIS X 6054-1:1999 – MIDI
 JIS X 6241:2004 – 120 mm DVD – Read-only disk
 JIS X 6243:1998 – 120 mm DVD Rewritable Disk (DVD-RAM)
 JIS X 6245:1999 – 80 mm (1.23GB/side) and 120 mm (3.95GB/side) DVD-Recordable-Disk (DVD-R)
 JIS X 6302-6:2011 - Identification cards—Recording technique—Part 6: Magnetic stripe—High coercivity
 JIS X 9051:1984 – 16-dots matrix character patterns for display devices
 JIS X 9052:1983 – 24-dots matrix character patterns for dot printers
  – Miscellaneous
 JIS Z 2371:2015 – Methods of salt spray testing
 JIS Z 3001-1　Welding and allied processes-Vocabulary-Part 1: General
 JIS Z 3001-2　Welding and allied processes-Vocabulary-Part 2: Welding processes
 JIS Z 3001-3　Welding and allied processes-Vocabulary-Part 3: Soldering and brazing
 JIS Z 3001-4　Welding and allied processes-Vocabulary-Part 4: Imperfections in welding
 JIS Z 3001-5　Welding and allied processes-Vocabulary-Part 5: Laser welding
 JIS Z 3001-6　Welding and allied processes-Vocabulary-Part 6: Resistance welding
 JIS Z 3001-7　Welding and allied processes-Vocabulary-Part 7: Arc welding
 JIS Z 3011　　Welding positions defined by means of angles of slope and rotation
 JIS Z 3021　　Welding and allied processes -- Symbolic representation
 JIS Z 8210   Public Information Symbols
 JIS Z 8301:2011 – Rules for the layout and drafting of Japanese Industrial Standards
 JIS Z 9098:2016 - Hazard specific evacuation guidance sign system
 JIS Z 9112:2012 – Classification of fluorescent lamps and light emitting diodes by chromaticity and colour rendering property

See also
International Organization for Standardization (ISO)
International Electrotechnical Commission (IEC)
Japanese Agricultural Standards
Korean Standards Association
Japanese typographic symbols – gives the Unicode symbol for the Japanese industrial standard
List of JIS categories (in Japanese)

References

External links
Japanese Industrial Standards Committee
Japanese Standards Association
Korean Standards Association
List of Japanese Standards JIS G – Ferrous Materials and Metallurgy
Details on the history of JIS (in Japanese)
JIS in decodeunicode JIS-Logo in Unicode
JIS search system (in Japanese)

Standards organizations in Japan
Certification marks
Industry in Japan
Symbols introduced in 1946
Symbols introduced in 2005
1946 establishments in Japan